Songgot: The Piercer is a 2015 South Korean television series starring Ji Hyun-woo and Ahn Nae-sang. Based on the webtoon Awl by Choi Kyu-seok, which is itself based on a true story that took place in 2007, the series aired on JTBC from October 24 to November 29, 2015.

Synopsis
At the retail market where he works, Lee Soo-in (Ji Hyun-woo) is ordered by his boss to fire temporary employees. Finding the situation unfair, Lee Soo-in joins the labor union and starts fighting back along with other employees.

Cast

Main
 Ji Hyun-woo as Lee Soo-in
 Ahn Nae-sang as Goo Go-shin

Supporting
 Hyun Woo as Joo Kang-min
 Park Si-hwan as Nam Dong-hyup
 Baek Hyun-joo as Han Young-sil
 Lee Bong-ryun as Mi-ran
 Lee Jung-eun as Kim Jung-mi
 Yesung as Hwang Joon-chul
 Hwang Jung-min as Hwang Jung-min
 Yoon Bo-hyun as Seo Min-ho
 Shin Yeon-sook as Joon-geum
 Jo Jae-ryong as Section chief Heo
 Ahn Sang-woo as Section chief Yoon
 Kim Joong-ki as Section chief Kim
 Kim Hee-won as Jung Min-chul
 Kim Ga-eun as Moon So-jin
 Kim Hee-chang as Cha Sung-hak
 Gong Jung-hwan as Go Jin-hee
 Moon Ji-yoon as Lee Tae-kyung

Special appearances
 Baek Eun-hye as Contact employee
 Lee Jae-yong as Lee Soo-in's homeroom teacher (Ep. 1)
 Park Hyuk-kwon as Refunded customer (Ep. 1)
 Choi Moo-sung as Lee Soo-in's father (Ep. 1)
 Choi Yong-min as Sergeant major Oh (Ep. 2)
 Go Soo-hee as Han Da-ye (Ep. 9)
 Lee Hye-sung as Ha Do-gang (Ep. 9)
 Lee Sun-ok as Lee Sun-ok (Ep. 9)
 Im Sung-eon as Lee Soo-in's wife (Ep. 10, 12)
 Cho Sang-geon as Dawon Enterprise's CEO (Ep. 12)
 Hong Ji-min as Hong Ji-min (Ep. 12)
 Lee Jong-soo as Office worker (Ep. 12)
 Shim Hee-sub as Lee Nak-gu (Ep. 12)

Original soundtrack

Part 1

Part 2

Part 3

Ratings
In this table,  represent the lowest ratings and  represent the highest ratings.

Awards and nominations

References

External links
  
 
 

JTBC television dramas
Korean-language television shows
2015 South Korean television series debuts
2015 South Korean television series endings
Workplace television series
Television shows based on South Korean webtoons
Television series by Signal Entertainment Group